Hubert Durrett Stephens (July 2, 1875March 14, 1946) was an American politician who served as a Democratic United States Senator from Mississippi from 1923 until 1935.

Stephens was born in New Albany, Mississippi. He graduated from the University of Mississippi law school and soon began to practice law in New Albany.

Stephens served in the U.S. House of Representatives from 1911 to 1921; in his final term he did not run for re-election, but he was elected to the U.S. Senate in 1922. In 1925 Stephens unsuccessfully attempted to intervene in the Lynching of L. Q. Ivy, a Black man accused of rape in New Albany. In 1934, he was defeated by Theodore Bilbo in the primary.

Stephens was the director of the Reconstruction Finance Corporation from 1935 to 1936. After that, he practiced law in Washington, D.C. before retiring to his Mississippi farm in 1941.

Further reading

References

External links
 

1875 births
1946 deaths
People from New Albany, Mississippi
Methodists from Mississippi
Democratic Party United States senators from Mississippi
Mississippi lawyers
Reconstruction Finance Corporation
University of Mississippi alumni
Democratic Party members of the United States House of Representatives from Mississippi